ASK Group, Inc., formerly ASK Computer Systems, Inc., was a producer of business and manufacturing software. It is best remembered for its Manman enterprise resource planning (ERP) software and for Sandra Kurtzig, the company's founder and one of the early female pioneers in the computer industry. At its peak, ASK had 91 offices in 15 countries before Computer Associates acquired the company in 1994.

Beginning and growth (1972–1982)
ASK was started in 1972 by Sandra Kurtzig in California. She left her job as a marketing specialist at General Electric and invested $2,000 of her savings to start the company in the apartment she shared with her HP salesman husband.

At first, the firm built software for a variety of business applications. ASK was incorporated in 1974.

In 1978, Kurtzig came up with ASK's most significant product, named Manman (originally "MaMa"), a contraction of manufacturing management. Manman was an ERP program that ran on Hewlett-Packard HP-3000 minicomputers. Manman helped manufacturing companies plan materials purchases, production schedules, and other administrative functions on a scale that was previously possible only on large, costly mainframe computers. Manman initially had a five-figure software price and was aimed at small and medium-sized manufacturers. Small companies desiring the least expensive implementation could use the software on a time-sharing contract.

During the era when Manman was only running on HP-3000 systems, ASK would buy systems at a discount and resell them "with its programs for $125,000 to $300,000" as turnkey systems.

Although ASK was initially named "standing for Arie and Sandra Kurtzig, although he is not an employee." Somewhat later, with her husband working for Hewlett Packard (HP); with the software being subsequently marketed both for HP's computers and those sold by Digital Equipment Corporation (DEC), Kurtzig said that "A" was for Associates.

Manman was an enormous success and quickly came to dominate the market for manufacturing systems and software. ASK's fortunes rose as a result. The corporation went public in 1981. Two years later, Sandra Kurtzig's personal stake in the firm was worth more than $40 million.

Plateau (1983–1989)

Software Dimensions: (March 1983 - June 1984)
In March 1983 ASK made its first acquisition, purchasing a privately held software company named Software Dimensions, Inc., publisher of Accounting Plus, for $6 million. After acquiring Software Dimensions, Kurtzig renamed it ASK Micro and launched an aggressive marketing program. ASK over-hired and mismanaged the sales channel for the product, angering existing sellers and ballooning the cash burn rate for the company; the product faltered. In June 1984, Kurtzig announced that she was shutting down ASK Micro, at a cost of $1 million, and auctioning off the rights to Accounting Plus. ASK also failed at rescaling Manman to run on personal computers. Of the company's failings in the emerging personal computer market, Kurtzig told BusinessWeek, "We have our fingerprints all over the murder weapon" that killed Software Dimensions. ASK never truly found its footing in the microcomputer market, and struggled to keep its market share from being eroded by competitors who offered similar solutions on smaller platforms.

Manman: lower prices, other declines (1984-1989)
By the fall of 1984, ASK planned to offer a version of its original product, Manman, for about one-third of its previous price. Lower-priced minicomputers from Hewlett-Packard and Digital Equipment Corporation (DEC), the product's two hardware platforms, made this possible. The company hoped to protect its market share with smaller companies and emergent middle-range manufacturers. However, by 1985, ASK declined as its customers reduced expenditures. Exacerbating the problem, Kurtzig and her family also began selling off large blocks of their stock holdings in the company, which triggered a shareholder lawsuit. Kurtzig also backed away from ASK's day-to-day operations. In 1984, Kurtzig named Ronald W. Branniff president of the company, and in 1985 he took over her post of chief executive officer as well. Kurtzig attributed her declining interest in the business to family pressures, along with other factors. Divorced from her husband, Kurtzig devoted more time to raising her two sons, who were aged 12 and 9 at the time.

Although the company remained profitable, ASK's earnings and sales declined in 1986, falling to $5.89 million on revenues of $76 million. ASK acquired NCA Corporation for $43 million in cash in 1987 which was a significant premium for a competitor that was beating them in two out of every three deals.  Despite these small advances, ASK was losing ground to its competitors. In its research and development activities, ASK began to focus nearly all of its resources on upgrading and improving existing products instead of creating new ones. Salespeople had long been bedeviled with having to sell a primitive, conversational, scrolling user interface (not long afterwards, the problem was that although not everyone knew what a relational database was, everyone wanted one.) ASK had lost its entrepreneurial edge.

In the meantime, Kurtzig had spent her time traveling, writing her autobiography, and investing in other technology companies, but this proved to be unfulfilling. In mid-1989 the ASK managing board approached Kurtzig and asked her to resume an active role in the company, and she accepted their invitation. Kurtzig spearheaded ASK's purchase of Data 3 Systems for $18.7 million, a privately owned competitor to ASK. In addition to this complementary expansion, Kurtzig began to revamp the way her old company had been run, shifting organization and priorities to new products. She changed such minor, but important, details as the quality of the food and beer at the company's Friday evening celebrations in an effort to reconnect upper level management with the company's employees. As part of this effort, Kurtzig instituted 360 degree reviews (where employees review bosses), hired entrepreneurial managers, spearheaded product entry into IBM and Sun Microsystems platforms, and opened international offices in Europe and Asia.  The improvements resulted in 1989's earnings of $13.5 million.

Decline and sale (1990–1994)
In 1990, ASK purchased the Ingres Corporation, a declining software company that developed the database management system called Ingres. The deal called for 30 percent of ASK to be sold to Hewlett-Packard and Electronic Data Systems (EDS) for a total of $60 million, which in turn enabled ASK to pay $110 million for Ingres. ASK's stockholders complained about this strange multi-way financing move. Shareholder James Lennane, who held ten percent of the company's shares, announced he would try to oust the company's board of directors at the next shareholders' meeting. Despite this, Kurtzig's deal proceeded as planned. ASK already made use of Ingres software in its own work, linking the accounting and manufacturing departments of its clients to its own database. Hewlett-Packard made the hardware upon which much of ASK's software ran, and the ASK resold Hewlett-Packard products as part of its software packages. Both Hewlett-Packard and EDS had strong histories of involvement with manufacturing businesses, and this heritage promised to open more potential markets for ASK.

Although this seemed like good news, ASK had mediocre results over the next several quarters, due to a lull in business while the company tried to bring new products to market. With its new purchases, ASK had moved beyond its original scope to become a much larger, global, diversified company. The unified ASK and Ingres group had yearly revenues of $400 million.

In the early 1990s, ASK concentrated on the development and introduction of new products designed to provide communication between different computer systems and programs. In 1992 the company introduced Manman/X, an update of its flagship product. Manman/x was built on the code base of a product called Triton 2.2d, from a little known Dutch company called Baan. ASK had acquired the rights to the code base and distribution in the 1990s.

In 1992 ASK was restructured to better reflect the nature of its operations. The company was renamed ASK Group, Inc., and comprised three business units — ASK Computer Systems, Data 3, and Ingres.  With the merger of ASK and Ingres completed, Kurtzig replaced herself as CEO in 1991, but remained non-executive chairman until 1992. Although ASK appeared to be on solid footing to face the computer industry's challenging, competitive environment, its fortunes continued to decline.   ASK annual revenues reached nearly $1 billion before being acquired by Computer Associates in 1994.

ManMan product family
Manman was a family of Enterprise resource planning (ERP) marketed for
Hewlett Packard HP-3000 and Digital Equipment Corporation (DEC) minicomputers. It's vendor, ASK Group, founded by Sandra Kurtzig,
was selling this software from, at ASK's peak, 91 offices in 15 countries. By 1994 annual sales reached nearly $1 billion,
and the company was acquired by Computer Associates (CA); both the software and CA subsequently declined.

The product family's name, Manman, was "short for manufacturing management," Its components included:
 Manman/AP: an accounts payable program. Since both HP and DEC's computers were time-sharing systems, the entry of data was done interactively. Vendor names and supplier payables could be viewed and, if necessary, revised from a computer terminal.
 Manman/MFG: to help plan and track the manufacturing process.
 Manman/OMAR: order management/AR. Orders were tracked by this software "until payment is received."
 Manman/GL: general ledger

Some of the ideas for these application programs came from founder Kurtzig's exposure to several areas within "General Electric, known to be synonymous with a well-run manufacturing operation." Modules for payroll, budgeting and other analysis were also sold by ASK.

During Manman's early era when it was only running on HP-3000 systems, ASK would buy systems at a discount and resell them
"with its programs for $125,000 to $300,000" as turnkey systems.

References

Defunct companies based in California
CA Technologies
History of software
Software companies established in 1972
Software companies disestablished in 1994
1994 disestablishments in California